Dalio is a surname. It may refer to:

Dalio Memić (born 1990), Bosnian-Herzegovinian footballer
Marcel Dalio (1899–1983), French character actor of Jewish origin
Paul Dalio (born 1979), American screenwriter, director and composer, son of Ray Dalio
Ray Dalio (born 1949), American billionaire investor, hedge fund manager and philanthropist, father of Paul Dalio